Notable people who were born in or have been residents of Montclair, New Jersey, include:

Academics and science

 Mark C. Alexander, law professor at Seton Hall University
 Buzz Aldrin (born 1930), astronaut, who was the second man to walk on the Moon
 Virginia Lee Block (1902–1970), psychologist who contributed to studies regarding child and adolescent psychology.
 Stella Stevens Bradford (1871–1959), doctor, specialist in tuberculosis and physical rehabilitation
 H. Bruce Franklin (born 1934), author and historian who was expelled from his Stanford University professorship for involvement in a leftist group
 Tom Galligan (born 1955), lawyer, legal scholar, administrator and educator who is currently the dean and professor of law of Louisiana State University's Paul M. Hebert Law Center
 Dean Hamer (born 1952), scientist, author and filmmaker who discovered a link between sexual orientation and Xq28
 Jordan Harrod (born 1996), research scientist and YouTuber who works on neuroengineering, brain-machine interfaces, and machine learning for medicine
 George Rice Hovey (1860–1943), university president, professor, minister, and author who served as the President of Virginia Union University from 1904 to 1918.
 John A. Kenney Jr. (1914–2003), pioneering African-American dermatologist who specialized in the study of skin disorders affecting racial minorities, earning him recognition as the "dean of black dermatology"
 Joshua Lederberg (1925–2008), geneticist who received the 1958 Nobel Prize in Physiology or Medicine for work in bacterial genetics; born in Montclair
 Ronald T. Raines (born 1958), chemical biologist and expert on the chemistry and biology of proteins
 Kenneth B. Smith (1931–2008), President of the Board of Education of the Chicago Public Schools who also served as President of the Chicago Theological Seminary
 Dr. Leo Sternbach (1908–2005), chemist, invented precursor to Valium
 Edward Weston (1850–1936), electrical engineer and inventor whose Weston Electrical Instrument Company won the contract to illuminate the Brooklyn Bridge

Arts

Authors, journalists and publishers

 Virginia Hamilton Adair (1913–2004), poet
 Jonathan Alter (born 1957), Newsweek magazine journalist
 Wheeler Antabanez (born 1977), author who has written for Weird NJ
 Mary Travis Arny (1909–1997), author, naturalist, historian and educator
 Jim Axelrod (born 1963), national correspondent for CBS News; reporter for the CBS Evening News
 Eric Boehlert (1965–2022), journalist, author, frequent contributor to The Huffington Post and contributing editor to Rolling Stone
 David Carr (1956–2015), media and culture columnist for The New York Times
 Wendy Coakley-Thompson (born 1966), author of the novel Back to Life
 Fleur Cowles (1908–2009), painter, journalist, hostess, socialite and founder of Flair magazine; claimed to have been born in Montclair but records from the United States Census Bureau indicate that she was born in New York City
 Oliver Crane (1822–1896), Presbyterian clergy, Oriental scholar and writer<ref>Whittemore, Henry. [https://books.google.com/books?id=dxyWmrN_apIC&pg=PA185 'History of Montclair Township: New Jersey; Including the History of the Families who Have Been Identified with Its Growth and Prosperity], p. 195. 'Suburban Publishing Company, 1894. Accessed May 27, 2022.</ref>
 Anthony DePalma (born 1952), author, journalist and educator who was a foreign correspondent and reporter for The New York Times Louise DeSalvo (1942–2018), author
 Christopher Durang (born 1949), contemporary playwright
 Edward S. Ellis (1840–1916), teacher, school administrator, journalist; author of hundreds of publications under his name and many pseudonymsStaff. "Edward S. Ellis", The New York Times, June 22, 1916. Accessed February 21, 2012. "His home was in Upper Montclair, N. J."
 Jessie Redmon Fauset (1882–1961), novelist, poet, literary critic for The Crisis; later teacher
 Philip L. Fradkin (1935–2012), environmentalist, historian, journalist, and author who wrote about topics including water conservation, earthquakes and nuclear weapons
 Dorothea Benton Frank (1951–2019), novelist
 Ian Frazier (born 1951), writer, humorist, and essayist
 Frank Bunker Gilbreth Sr. (1868–1924) and Lillian Moller Gilbreth (1878–1972), and their twelve children, featured in the autobiography Cheaper by the Dozen and Belles on Their Toes by Ernestine Gilbreth Carey and Frank Bunker Gilbreth Jr.
 Bob Herbert (born 1945), syndicated op-ed columnist for The New York Times Ken Johnson (born 1953), art critic for The New York Times Jon Katz (born 1947), author
 Peter King (born 1957), journalist and Sports Illustrated senior writer
 Michael Laser (born 1954), author
 Donna Leon (born 1942), novelist
 Arthur Levine (born 1962), editor, author and publisher of children's books, including the American editions of the Harry Potter series
 Lisa Lucas, executive director of the National Book Foundation and senior vice president at Knopf Doubleday
 Anne McCaffrey (1926–2011), prolific writer of fantasy and science fiction best known for her Dragonriders of Pern seriesSherman, Ted. "Fantasy writer, former N.J. resident Anne McCaffrey dead at 85", The Star-Ledger, November 23, 2011. Accessed February 6, 2012. "Born in Cambridge, Mass., McCaffrey was raised in New Jersey, where she graduated from Montclair High School."
 Susan Meddaugh, author of the Martha Speaks series of children's books, whose first home in Montclair was 33 Fairfield Street, where Martha the talking dog "lives" now
 Gil Noble (1932–2012), American television reporter and interviewer
 Isabel Paterson (1886–1961), journalist, novelist, political philosopher, author of The God of the Machine Julia Phillips (born 1989), author whose book Disappearing Earth was a finalist for the 2019 National Book Award for Fiction
 Jodi Rudoren (born 1970), journalist and editor of The Forward Pamela Redmond Satran (born 1953), author
 Andrew Rosenthal (born 1956), editorial page editor of The New York Times and son of the paper's former executive editor A.M. Rosenthal
 Roger Sedarat, poet, scholar and literary translator
 Florence Guy Woolston Seabury (1881–1951), feminist essayist
 Lee Siegel (born 1957), writer and cultural critic
 Richard Wesley (born 1945), screenwriter and playwright
 Valerie Wilson Wesley (born 1947), mystery writer
 Jana Winter, Fox News Channel reporter

Fashion
 Bobbi Brown (born 1957), makeup artist
 Lisa Lindahl (born 1948), writer, artist, activist and inventor.
 Jack McCollough (born 1978), fashion designer; co-creator of Proenza Schouler
 Polly Smith (born 1949), designer, inventor and creator of the sports bra, who was a costume designer for The Muppet Show and Sesame Street.
 Louise Vyent, Dutch-born fashion model and portrait photographer

Fictional characters
 Paul Kinsey, on Mad Men Millicent Kent, in David Foster Wallace's novel Infinite Jest Office of Jennifer Melfi, on The Sopranos Marnie Michaels, on GirlsFine arts
 Thomas Ball (1819–1911), sculptor
 Nanette Carter (born 1954), artist and college educator, best known for her collages with paper, canvas and Mylar
 Jane White Cooke (1913–2011), portrait painter
 William Couper (1853–1942), sculptor
 Edna Eicke (1919–1979), illustrator
 Harry Fenn (1845–1911), English-born illustrator, primarily of landscapes
 Lola Flash (born 1959), photographer known for her genderqueer visual political work
 Russ Heath (1926–2018), cartoonist best known for his comic book work with DC Comics
 John Langley Howard (1902–1999), muralist, printmaker and illustrator, known for his social realism
 George Inness (1825–1894), landscape painter
 Elizabeth Jones (born 1935), Chief Engraver of the United States Mint, holding this position from 1981 until her resignation in 1991
 Joe McNally (born 1952), photographer
 Dorothy Canning Miller (1904–2003), art curator
 Tom Nussbaum (born 1953), sculptor and visual artist
 Michael Yamashita (born 1949), photographer known for his work in National Geographic and his multiple books of photographs

Movies, stage and television

 Charles S. Belden (1904–1954), screenwriter and journalist, known for writing screenplays to several Charlie Chan films in the 1930s
 Richard E. Besser (born 1959), former acting director of Centers for Disease Control; former Senior Health and Medical Editor at ABC News
 John Block (born 1951), documentary filmmaker
 Elaine Bromka (born 1950), actress who co-wrote the play Lady Bird, Pat & Betty: Tea for Three Richard Burgi (born 1958), actorNovakovich, Lilana. "Another World's Burgi loves adventure", The Toronto Sun, September 28, 1987. Accessed February 6, 2012. "Burgi hails from Montclair, N.J., his father was Swiss and his mother is of Scottish extraction. "I checked out my family when I was in Europe," he says. 'One of my Swiss relatives discovered gold in this country.' ... His parents were involved in local theatre and the family shared a passion for music, their home often the site of neighborhood jam sessions, with Burgi and brother Chuck on drums.
 John Callahan (1953–2020), actor, Falcon Crest, Santa Barbara, All My Children, Days of Our Lives Stephen Colbert (born 1964), television personality, host of The Late Show with Stephen ColbertKuperinsky, Amy. "Julia Louis-Dreyfus headed to N.J. for Stephen Colbert Montclair Film Fest event", NJ Advance Media for NJ.com, September 13, 2019. Accessed October 30, 2019. "The host of The Late Show with Stephen Colbert and a resident of Montclair, Colbert regularly fronts the winter fundraiser as well as parts of the spring film festival."
 Margaret Colin (born 1957), actress, Gossip Girl, The Edge of Night, Something Wild, Independence Day Michael Colleary (born 1960), screenwriter and producer of Face/Off, Lara Croft Tomb Raider and Firehouse Dog R.J. Colleary (born 1957), television writer, producer and playwright, Touched By An Angel, Harry and the Hendersons, Cannibals Robert M. Colleary (1929–2012), Peabody and Emmy Award-winning comedy writer best known for his more than two decades as head writer on Captain Kangaroo Kristen Connolly (born 1980), actress
 Kahane Cooperman, documentary filmmaker and television director and producer, whose 2016 documentary Joe's Violin was nominated for an Academy Award for Best Documentary Short Subject
 Justin Deas (born 1948), actor
 Dagmara Dominczyk (born 1976), actress
 Olympia Dukakis (1931–2021), Academy Award-winning actress, Moonstruck, Steel Magnolias, Mr. Holland's Opus Allen B. DuMont (1901–1965), television pioneer
 Beth Ehlers (born 1968), actress on Guiding Light and All My Children Frankie Faison (born 1949), actor, The Silence of the Lambs Frank Field (born 1923), meteorologist, former resident
 Savion Glover (born 1974), tap dancer and choreographer
 Peter Greene (born 1965), actor, Pulp Fiction, The Mask Sterling Hayden (1916–1986), actor, Dr. Strangelove, The Godfather, The Asphalt Jungle, 9 to 5 Anthony Heald (born 1944), actor, The Silence of the Lambs, Boston Public Shuler Hensley (born 1967), actor; won a Tony Award for Oklahoma! Louis Jean Heydt (1903–1960), actor
 Steve Hofstetter (born 1979), comedian and radio personality
 Janet Hubert-Whitten (born 1956), television and Broadway actress
 Whip Hubley, actor who appeared in Top Gun Vincent Irizarry (born 1959), Emmy Award-winning actor who appeared on All My Children The Amazing Kreskin (born 1935), paranormalist and TV personalityStaff. "Jersey's Amazing Kreskin can foresee it", The Star-Ledger, March 13, 2009. Accessed December 30, 2013. "Before he was Kreskin, though, he was George Joseph Kresge, a little Polish/Sicilian kid born in Montclair in 1935."
 Eva La Rue (born 1966), actress, model, singer
 Nicole Leach (born 1979), actress
 Delroy Lindo (born 1952), actor nominated for Tony and SAG awards; Get Shorty, The Cider House Rules, Crooklyn, Gone in 60 Seconds, Malcolm X, More American Graffiti Warren Littlefield (born 1952), President of NBC in the 1990s
 Priscilla Lopez (born 1948), actress, singer, dancer, Maid in Manhattan Tyler Mathisen (born 1957), writer, editor, co-host of CNBC's Power Lunch John Miller (born 1959), journalist, author, former FBI and ABC News journalist, current CBS News Senior Correspondent and investigative reporter
 Trevor Moore (1980–2021), comedian, actor, writer, director, and producer, The Whitest Kids U'Know Joe Morton (born 1947), actor, ScandalPacheco, Patrick. "Theater / Black, White And the Blues / Joe Morton is the first black actor to buy the white painting in `Art.' He also plays the blues.", Newsday, January 3, 1999. Accessed April 16, 2012. "His favorite sculptors are Brancusi and Nora Chavooshian, Morton's wife. Morton and Chavooshian live in Montclair, N.J. – where they have his-and-her studios (she to sculpt, he to play blues on the guitar) – with their two young children."
 Raphaela Neihausen (born 1976), filmmaker and producer
 Michael O'Leary (born 1958), actor who portrayed Dr. Fredrick "Rick" Bauer on Guiding LightStaff. "Say what? Montclair budget soap opera, police on the Q-T3, Bob and the Big Man", The Montclair Times, June 24, 2011. Accessed April 30, 2012. "Montclair attracts more than its fair share of entertainment and media types. And one of them, former Guiding Light star Michael O'Leary, showed up at Tuesday night's Township Council meeting to voice his concern about the municipal budget and spiraling taxes."
 Roscoe Orman (born 1944), actor who portrayed Gordon Robinson on Sesame StreetDougherty, Frank. "Radnor Studio 21 GM interviews TV legend 'Gordon' of 'Sesame Street'" , Main Line Suburban Life, June 22, 2010. Accessed April 16, 2012. "A New Jersey resident, Orman and his wife live in Montclair. They are the parents of four children, the youngest in high school, and five grandchildren."
 Stacie Passon (born 1969), film director and screenwriter
 Kal Penn (born 1977), actor, Harold & Kumar Go to White Castle. He was also a government employee
 Todd Porter (born 1968), child/teen actor, Starstuff, Pinocchio's Christmas, Whiz Kids Christina Ricci (born 1980), actress whose films include The Addams Family, Buffalo '66, Monster, Sleepy Hollow Rosemary Rice (1925–2012), actress; played Katrin on Mama; voice-over artist and children's musicianSlotnik, Daniel E. "Rosemary Rice, Oldest Daughter of TV's 'Mama,' Dies at 87", The New York Times, August 22, 2012. Accessed October 19, 2012. "Rosemary Rice was born on May 3, 1925, in Montclair, N.J. She appeared in Broadway shows like Gypsy Rose Lee's 1943 comedy, "The Naked Genius," and on the radio in soap operas and mystery shows."
 Ben Rosenfield (born 1992), actor
 Bruce Sinofsky (1956–2015), screenwriter, editor, producer and filmmaker, 2012 Academy Award nominee
 Elaine Stewart (1930–2011), model and Hollywood actress of the 1950s, promoted as a "dark-haired Marilyn Monroe"
 Sophia Takal, actress, writer and director
 Michelle Thomas (1968–1998), actress who played Myra on Family Matters Dallas Townsend (1919–1995), anchor for CBS World News Roundup Adam Wade (1935–2022), singer, musician and actor, whose stint as host of the CBS game show Musical Chairs (1975) made him the first Black game show host in the United States.
 Jake Weary (born 1990), actor, As the World Turns Mary Alice Williams (born 1949), television personality
 Wendy Williams (born 1964), TV and radio personality, host of The Wendy Williams Show Patrick Wilson (born 1973), actor, who has appeared in Watchmen, The A-Team and Little ChildrenKaulessar, Ricardo. "Tom Perrotta to talk about turning novels into movie and TV successes", The Record, March 13, 2018. Accessed June 7, 2018. "he Union County native, who now resides in Massachusetts, will discuss the novel-to-movie transformation with actor and Montclair resident Patrick Wilson."
 Alex Winter (born 1965), actor
 Kim Zimmer (born 1955), actress best known for appearing on Guiding LightAraton, Harvey. "When Suds Subside", The New York Times, November 6, 2009. Accessed December 30, 2013. "Ms. Zimmer had played the tempestuous Reva Shayne Lewis since 1983, with one five-year break, while nesting more conventionally with her husband, the director A. C. Weary, and their three children in Montclair, N.J."
 Louis Zorich (1924–2018), actor, who appeared on Mad About You; husband of actress Olympia Dukakis

Music

 Geri Allen (1957–2017), jazz pianist
 Al Anderson (born 1950), guitarist and songwriter; played with Bob Marley & The Wailers
 David Bendeth (born 1954), musician, songwriter and producer
 Chuck Burgi (born 1952), drummer
 Jackie Cain (1928–2014), jazz singer known for her partnership with her husband in the duo Jackie and Roy
 Ted Curson (1935–2012), jazz trumpeter
 Robert DeLeo (born 1966), bass player, songwriter, and harmony vocalist for the Stone Temple Pilots
 Tommy DeVito (1928–2020), guitarist and vocalist for The Four Seasons
 Michael Fabiano (born 1984), opera singer
 Hussein Fatal (1973–2015), rapper, former member of the Outlawz
 Bob Gaudio (born 1942), singer, songwriter, musician, record producer and songwriting member of The Four Seasons
 Evan Stephens Hall (born 1989), musician best known as frontman of indie rock band Pinegrove
 Billy Hart (born 1940), jazz drummer
 Herman Hupfeld (1894–1951), lyricist who wrote "As Time Goes By", the song featured in the 1943 Oscar winner Casablanca Dorothy Kirsten (1910–1992), lyric soprano
 Vincent La Selva (1929–2017), symphony and opera conductor
 Gene Lake (born 1966) jazz drummer
 Oliver Lake (born 1944), alto saxophone player and composerCannon, Bob. "Oliver Lake brings Big Band to the Montclair Public Library", The Montclair Times, April 7, 2016. Accessed September 18, 2017. "Lake, a Montclair resident since 1989, brings his adventurous Big Band to the Montclair Public Library for a rare hometown concert on Saturday, April 9, at 2 p.m."
 Joseph Lamb (1887–1960), prominent composer of ragtime music
 Reggie Lucas (1953–2018), musician, songwriter and record producer best known for having produced the majority of Madonna's 1983 self-titled debut album
 Gregori Lukas (born 1990), recording artist, singer, dancer and actor
 Christian McBride (born 1972), three-time Grammy Award winner for jazz (bass)
 Jim McNeely (born 1949), Grammy-winning jazz pianist, composer and arranger
 Anwar Robinson (born 1979), singer, contestant on American IdolStrauss, Robert. "His kind of role in 'Rent' Anwar Robinson, who got his start performing on American Idol, plays a teacher in the touring musical. And that's what he is in 'real life.'", The Philadelphia Inquirer, January 4, 2008. Accessed December 30, 2013. "'I worked in Elizabeth and in West Orange, but it was a redeeming kind of work. The students were always motivated. They were really good,' said Robinson, 27, who grew up in the middle-class suburb of Montclair, about 15 miles from Manhattan."
 Wallace Roney (1960–2020), trumpet player and jazz musician
 Adam Schlesinger (1967–2020), musician, bass player for Fountains of Wayne and Ivy
 Duncan Sheik (born 1969), singer-songwriter, composer; known for his 1996 single, "Barely Breathing", and his work on the award-winning musical Spring Awakening Ty Taylor (born 1967), guitarist and vocalist of R&B group Dakota Moon; contestant on the reality TV show Rock Star: INXS Dennis "Dee Tee" Thomas (1951–2021), alto saxophone player, flautist, and percussionist, who was a founding member of R&B/soul/funk Kool & the Gang
 Steve Turre (born 1948), jazz trombonist and member of Saturday Night Live band since 1984
 Joe Walsh (born 1947), musician/songwriter for the James Gang and the Eagles
 Carol Williams, disco musician
 Reggie Workman (born 1937), jazz musician
 Jenny Owen Youngs (born 1981), singer/songwriter

Business
 George Batten (1854–1918), advertising executive whose firm was part of the merger that created what is now BBDO
 Clarence Birdseye (1886–1956), inventor, entrepreneur and naturalist who is considered to be the founder of the modern frozen food industry
 John C. Bogle (1929–2019), founder and CEO of The Vanguard Group, a pioneer in financial investments
 John J. Cali (1918–2014), real estate developer
 Israel Crane (1774–1858), merchant
 Allen B. DuMont (1901–1965), television pioneer and inventor who created the DuMont Television Network
 Floyd Hall (1995–2001), CEO of Kmart
 Charles B. Johnson (born 1933), businessman
 Ken Kurson (born 1968), political consultant, writer and journalist, who was editor-in-chief of The New York Observer between 2013 and 2017
 Geraldine Laybourne (born 1947), former TV executive and entrepreneur, co-founder of Nickelodeon and Oxygen cable networks
 Benjamin Moore (1905–1917), co-founder with his brother Robert of Benjamin Moore & Co, in Brooklyn in 1883; lived in Upper Montclair
 Guy T. Viskniskki (1876–1949), newspaper editor and news executive who founded the World War I edition of the Stars and Stripes newspaper while serving as a U.S. Army officer in France with the American Expeditionary Force

Government, politics, law, and military

 Bradley Abelow (born 1958), New Jersey State Treasurer, appointed by Governor of New Jersey Jon CorzineChen, David W. "The Goldman Sachs Crew That's Helping Run Trenton Government", The New York Times, October 4, 2006. Accessed December 30, 2013. "'We are not so smart as to think we know all the right answers to all the questions,' said Mr. Abelow, who moved from the Upper West Side to Montclair this summer because of residency requirements for cabinet officials."
 Steve Adubato Jr. (born 1957), former member of the New Jersey General Assembly; talk show host
 W. I. Lincoln Adams (1865–1946), politician, banker and soldier
 Tom Ammiano (born 1941), politician and LGBT rights activist who served as a member of the California State Assembly and on the San Francisco Board of Supervisors
 Norman Atkins (1934–2010), Canadian Senator and a political figure in Canada
 Jane Barus (1892–1977), member of the Constitutional convention that formulated the 1947 New Jersey State Constitution
 Lezli Baskerville (born 1956), lawyer who has served as president and CEO of the National Association for Equal Opportunity in Higher Education
 Wendy Benchley (born 1941), marine and environmental conservation advocate and former elected official who was the wife of author Peter Benchley
 Bill Bradley (born 1942), former forward for the New York Knicks; U.S. Senator; prospective presidential candidate
 Raymond A. Brown (1915–2009), attorney whose clients included Black Liberation Army member Assata Shakur, boxer Rubin "Hurricane" Carter and "Dr. X" physician Mario Jascalevich
 Christopher Cerf (born ), former Commissioner of the New Jersey Department of Education who is the state-appointed Superintendent of the Newark Public Schools
 Bayard H. Faulkner (1894–1983), mayor and chairman of the Commission on Municipal Government that created New Jersey's Optional Municipal Charter Law, better known eponymously as the Faulkner Act
 Paul J. Fishman (born 1957), United States Attorney for the District of New Jersey
 Edwin J. Godfrey (1932–2002), lieutenant general in the United States Marine Corps who served as Commander of Fleet Marine Force, Pacific
 William H. Gray (1941–2013), Congressman who served as head of the United Negro College Fund
 Harold Harrison (1872–1953), businessman and politician who served in the Minnesota House of Representatives from 1937 to 1940 and in the Minnesota Senate from 1941 to 1950
 Lonna Hooks, Secretary of State of New Jersey from 1994 to 1998, under Governor of New Jersey Christine Todd Whitman
 Jeh Johnson (born 1957), lawyer and former government official who was United States Secretary of Homeland Security from 2013 to 2017
 Jim Johnson (born 1960), former Department of Treasury official and activist
 J. Erik Jonsson (1901–1995), businessman, philanthropist, and mayor of Dallas, Texas, who was reared in Montclair
 Don Katz (born 1952), founder and executive chairman of Audible, Inc.
 Sean T. Kean (born 1963), politician who represents the 11th Legislative District in the New Jersey General Assembly
 Arthur Kinoy (1920–2003), activist lawyer who was part of the team that represented the Chicago Seven
 Howard Krongard (born 1940), head of the Office of the Inspector General of the Department of State
 Archie Lochhead (1892–1971), first director of the Exchange Stabilization Fund and President of the Universal Trading Corporation
 Ellen Malcolm (born 1947), activist with a long career in American politics, particularly in political fundraising, who founded EMILY's List in 1985
 Benjamin Chavis Muhammad (born 1948), civil rights activist
 Imani Oakley (born 1990), 2022 candidate for Congress in New Jersey's 10th congressional district in the U.S. House of Representatives, former legislative director for New Jersey branch of the Working Families Party and political organizer
 Price D. Rice (1916–1999), U.S. Army Air Corps/U.S. Air Force officer/full-bird Colonel and member of the Tuskegee Airmen
 Mikie Sherrill (born 1972), former United States Navy pilot and prosecutor who represents New Jersey's 11th District in the U.S. House of Representatives
 Lucy Stone (1818–1893), feminist and suffragist
 Benjamin Strong Jr. (1872–1928), governor of the Federal Reserve Bank of New York
 Edward W. Townsend (1855–1942), represented New Jersey's 6th congressional district, 1911–1913, and the 10th district, 1913–1915
 James Wallwork (born 1930), politician who served in both houses of the New Jersey Legislature
 Norman H. White (1871–1951), publisher and politician who served in the Massachusetts House of Representatives

Sports

 Josh Allen (born 1997), outside linebacker for the Jacksonville Jaguars
 William Andre (1931–2019), modern pentathlete who won a silver medal in the team event at the 1956 Summer Olympics
 Yael Averbuch (born 1986), soccer player
 Me'Lisa Barber (born 1980), track and field sprint athlete
 Dale Berra (born 1956), infielder who played for the Pittsburgh Pirates, New York Yankees and Houston Astros
 Tim Berra (born 1951), wide receiver who played in the NFL for the Baltimore Colts
 Yogi Berra (1925–2015), baseball player and manager with the New York Yankees and New York Mets
 Bob Bradley (born 1958), soccer coach of the Egypt national football team; former manager of the United States men's national soccer team
 Bill Byrne (1940–2021), American football guard who played professional football for the Philadelphia Eagles
 David Caldwell (born 1987), football safety for the Hamilton Tiger-Cats, previously with the Indianapolis Colts
 Peter A. Carlesimo (1915–2003), basketball coach
 Wally Choice (1932-2018), basketball player who played professionally with the Harlem Globetrotters
 Leonard S. Coleman Jr. (born 1949), last president of the National League, serving from 1994 until 1999 when the position was eliminated by Major League BaseballStaff. "Len Coleman: the National League's new president takes charge", Ebony, June 1994. Accessed September 1, 2016. "Coleman's route to the presidency took a number of turns, but he came with a wealth of experience and a strong athletic background. He grew up in Montclair; N.J., and excelled in baseball and football at Montclair High School. In his senior year, he was an All-American halfback, and the ring he still wears today is evidence that he was a part of New Jersey's All-State backfield that included Joe Theismann, Franco Harris and Jack Tatum, all of whom went on to the NFL."
 Te'a Cooper (born 1997), professional basketball player for the Phoenix Mercury of the Women's National Basketball Association
 Kyle Copeland (born 1961), former professional tennis player
 Brandon Costner (born 1987), professional basketball player for Patriots BBC of the Basketball Africa League
 Tony Costner (born 1962), former professional basketball player who was selected by the Washington Bullets in the 2nd round (34th overall) of the 1984 NBA Draft before playing in Europe
 Larry Doby (1923–2003), second African-American to play professional baseball in Major League Baseball"MSU Professor Featured in Showtime Special on Baseball Great and Civil Rights Pioneer Larry Doby", Montclair State University press release dated January 26, 2007. "Doby lived in Montclair for many years before his death in 2003 and received an honorary degree from Montclair State University in 1987."
 Hollie Donan (1928–2014), defensive tackle who played college football for Princeton University and was inducted into the College Football Hall of Fame in 1984
 Avery Ellis (born 1994), professional Canadian football defensive lineman for the Ottawa Redblacks of the Canadian Football League
 Alex Ferguson (1897–1976), right-handed pitcher; played for the New York Yankees, Boston Red Sox, Washington Senators, Philadelphia Phillies, and Brooklyn Robins; played in the 1925 World Series
 Don Garber (born 1957), commissioner of Major League SoccerFensom, Michael J. "MLS Commissioner Don Garber talks about growth of league with All-Star Game headed to Red Bull Arena", The Star-Ledger, July 24, 2011. Accessed December 30, 2013. "At Garber's home in Montclair, the town where he and his family have lived since October, 1989, his interests can be deduced from the surroundings."
 Mule Haas (1903–1974), Major League Baseball centerfielder from 1925 to 1938
 Myisha Hines-Allen (born 1996), professional basketball player who plays for the Washington Mystics of the WNBA
 Billy "Brud" Johnson (1918–2006), New York Yankees third baseman who played nine seasons in the majors and missed two seasons for military service during World War IIBill Johnson, Historic Baseball. Accessed July 25, 2011.
 Rees Jones (born 1941), golf course architect
 Robert Trent Jones Jr. (born 1939), golf course architect
 Robert Trent Jones Sr. (1906–2000), golf course architect; moved here from England where he married and raised two sons, both following in their father's footsteps
 Sean Jones (born 1962), defensive end for the Raiders, Oilers, and the Packers; played in the 1997 Super Bowl championship
 Rich Kenah (born 1970), middle-distance runner; won bronze medals over 800 meters at the 1997 World Indoor Championships and 1997 World Championships in Athens; member of the US Team at the 2000 Summer Olympics in Sydney
 Aubrey Lewis (1935–2001), The Star-Ledger'''s Football Player of the Century who was a football and track star with the Notre Dame Fighting Irish
 Andrew Lombard (born 1997), footballer who plays as a defender for the New York Red Bulls II in the United Soccer League
 Dave Meads (born 1964), pitcher for the Houston Astros who had an 8–4 career record
 John McMullen (1918–2005), naval architect and marine engineer; former owner of the New Jersey Devils and Houston Astros
 Jeff Mills (born 1968), linebacker who played four seasons in the NFL with the San Diego Chargers and Denver Broncos
 Mackenzie Molner (born 1988), chess grandmaster and instructor
 Scott Niedermayer (born 1973), retired hockey defenseman who played for the New Jersey Devils and Anaheim Ducks
 Ron Simpson, former professional basketball player
 William Steinitz (1836–1900), one of the greatest chess masters of the 19th century; first world champion; known as the "Bohemian Caesar"
 Michael Strahan (born 1971), NFL defensive end for the New York Giants; holds single season sack record
 Willie Taylor (born 1955), wide receiver for the Green Bay Packers
 Bob Torrey (1878–1941), football player and coach who was the captain of the University of Pennsylvania's unbeaten teams of 1904 and 1905 and was elected to the College Football Hall of Fame in 1971
 David Tyree (born 1980), NFL wide receiver for the New York Giants; 1998 graduate of Montclair High School
 Ingrid Wells (born 1989), soccer player
 Earl Williams (1948–2013), baseball player; National League's rookie of the Year in 1971
 Isaiah Williams (born 1987), wide receiver who played in the Canadian Football League for the Edmonton Eskimos
 Dainius Zubrus (born 1978), forward for New Jersey Devils

Other

 Paul Cushing Child (1902–1994), husband of chef Julia Child, who introduced his wife to fine cuisine, which began her legendary career
 Victor E. Engstrom (1914–2000), philatelist
 Vladimir Guryev and Lydia Guryev, a.k.a. Richard and Cynthia Murphy, arrested in their Montclair home June 2010 by FBI; admitted in court to being agents of the Russian Federation and pleaded guilty to conspiracy to act as unregistered agents; expelled with eight others in a prisoner exchange with Russia
 Florence Merriam Johnson (–1954), American Red Cross nurse during World War I, received Florence Nightingale Medal
 Isaac Newton Lewis (1858–1931), soldier and inventor who created the Lewis gun
 Mizkif (born 1995), Twitch streamer
 Pearl Grigsby Richardson (1896–1983), educator and clubwoman.

References

Montclair

People by township in New Jersey